Graphosia polylophota is a moth of the family Erebidae. It was described by George Hampson in 1914. It is found on New Guinea. The small to medium-sized adults are often white, yellow, orange, or red with black markings on the forewings.

References

 

Lithosiina
Moths described in 1914